Austerlitz, near Oscar, Louisiana in Pointe Coupee Parish, was built in 1832.  It was listed on the National Register of Historic Places in 1991.

It includes Federal and French Creole architecture.

References

Houses on the National Register of Historic Places in Louisiana
Federal architecture in Louisiana
Houses completed in 1832
Pointe Coupee Parish, Louisiana